The Unmarried Wife is a 2016 Filipino romance drama film starring Angelica Panganiban, Dingdong Dantes, and Paulo Avelino. The film is directed by Maryo J. de los Reyes while the story is written by Keiko Aquino under the production of Star Cinema. The film project marks the reunion of Panganiban and Dantes after their box-office success with One More Try (2012) with Angel Locsin and Zanjoe Marudo. It is also Dingdong's fourth time to lead in Star Cinema movies after Segunda Mano (2011), One More Try (2012), and She's the One (2013).

In the movie, Angelica portrays a woman torn between her husband and her lover.

The film is screening across the Philippines as well as a limited release in Canada and the United States.

In December 2017, Panganiban won the Best Actress Award for the film at the 2017 FAMAS Awards for the film, Dingdong Dantes for the FPJ Lifetime Achievement Award, and Vanessa Valdez for Best Screenplay.

Cast

 Angelica Panganiban as Anne Victorio
 Dingdong Dantes as Geoff Victorio
 Paulo Avelino as Bryan
 Maricar Reyes as Cristina
 Denise Laurel as Louise
 Dimples Romana as Carmela
 Justin Cuyugan as Bobby
 Martin Escudero as Geru
 Pamu Pamorada as Laika
 Lei Andre Navarro as Ino
 Irma Adlawan as Veronica
 Marina Benipayo as Lorraine
 Loren Burgos as Lorena
 Joan Palisoc as Camille
 Jace Flores as Frank
 Joaquin Manansala as Jax
 Anne Feo

Release
The film was released on November 16, 2016 in Philippine cinemas nationwide, earning ₱17 million on its first day of showing. On its 6th day, the film breached the ₱100 million mark  while it reached ₱170 million on its two-week run.

Local Awards

References

2016 films
Philippine romantic drama films
Films directed by Maryo J. de los Reyes